Blea Tarn may refer to:
Blea Tarn (Borrowdale), small lake above Watendlath in Borrowdale  in English Lake District
Blea Tarn (Eskdale), small lake in Eskdale in English Lake District
Blea Tarn (Langdale), small lake in Little Langdale in English Lake District

See also
Blea Water, small lake east of High Street in English Lake District
Blea Tarn Reservoir, above Lancaster, Lancashire
Blea Tarn Fell, alternative name for Bell Crags, mountain in English Lake District